Park High School is a coeducational secondary school located in Colne in the English county of Lancashire.

Previously a community school administered by Lancashire County Council, in September 2018 Park High School converted to academy status and is now sponsored by The Pennine Trust.

The school offers GCSEs and BTECs as programmes of study for pupils.

Notable former pupils 
 Steven Burke – Olympic track and road cyclist who rides for the WIGGINS Team.
 Natalie Gumede – English actress best known for playing China in BBC Three's Ideal and Kirsty Soames in Coronation Street.
 Heather Hancock – Chair of the Food Standards Agency and current Master of St John's College, Cambridge.
 Rosemary Lain-Priestley - Church of England priest and former Archdeacon for the Two Cities

References

External links
Park High School official website

Secondary schools in Lancashire
Colne
Academies in Lancashire
Schools in the Borough of Pendle